St Johnstown was a borough constituency for St Johnston in County Donegal represented in the Irish House of Commons until 1800.

Members of Parliament

Notes

References

Historic constituencies in County Donegal
Constituencies of the Parliament of Ireland (pre-1801)
1800 disestablishments in Ireland
Constituencies disestablished in 1800